Euriphene pinkieana is a butterfly in the family Nymphalidae. It is found in Gabon and the Republic of the Congo. The habitat consists of forests.

References

Butterflies described in 1975
Euriphene